Herbert Melville Little FRCOG (December 11, 1877 –  October 11, 1934) was a Canadian gynaecologist and lecturer in obstetrics and gynaecology at McGill University.

He was born in London, Ontario.  He completed his undergraduate studies at the University of Toronto in 1897 and graduated in medicine from McGill in 1901.

During World War I, he served as paymaster and adjutant with the McGill Unit 3rd Canadian General Hospital.

He was assistant gynaecologist at the Montreal General Hospital and from 1925 gynaecologist-in-chief there. He was a foundation fellow of the Royal College of Obstetricians and Gynaecologists.

References

External links
 PubMed search for Herbert Melville Little

1877 births
1934 deaths
Fellows of the Royal College of Obstetricians and Gynaecologists
Canadian gynaecologists
Physicians of Montreal General Hospital
McGill University Faculty of Medicine alumni
Academic staff of McGill University
Canadian military personnel of World War I
University of Toronto alumni